Orlovsky District is the name of several administrative and municipal districts in Russia. The name is generally derived from or is related to the root "oryol" ("eagle").
Orlovsky District, Kirov Oblast, an administrative and municipal district of Kirov Oblast
Orlovsky District, Oryol Oblast, an administrative and municipal district of Oryol Oblast
Orlovsky District, Rostov Oblast, an administrative and municipal district of Rostov Oblast

See also
Orlovsky (disambiguation)

References